The Pet Network was a Canadian English language Category B specialty channel owned by Stornoway Communications. The channel broadcast entertainment and information programming for children and adults primarily related to pets in the form of feature films, documentary films, television dramas, cartoons, docuseries, and more.

History
In November 2000, a joint venture between Stornoway Communications and Cogeco were granted approval by the Canadian Radio-television and Telecommunications Commission (CRTC) to launch a television channel called The Pet Network, described as "a national English-language Category 2 specialty television service devoted to pets and working animals."

Prior to the channel's launch, in January 2004, the CRTC approved an application that would see Stornoway acquire Cogeco's interest in the proposed service, along with all other services owned by Storonoway, namely ichannel and bpm:tv.

In November 2004, Stornoway announced that it had reached an agreement with Rogers Communications to launch the channel on its digital cable platform in December 2004. The channel subsequently ran a 30-minute promotional program on a loop from November 23 until its official launch on December 3 at 5:00pm EST.

The channel would subsequently be added to various other television services providers over the years since its launch, however, the largest being Shaw Cable and Shaw Direct, added in October and November 2010, respectively. The launch on the Shaw Communications-owned platforms gave the channel wide distribution in Western Canada on cable and nationally via satellite. 

On November 12, 2012, to coincide with the launch of the channel's 2012-2013 fall programming launch, The Pet Network underwent a rebranding including of a new logo, on-air graphics, and website.

In early April 2016, it was revealed by several television service providers, via their respective websites and other communications, that the channel would cease broadcasting on May 2, 2016. Stornoway Communications, who earlier shuttered another one of its own television channels, bpm:tv, in June 2015, revealed through regulatory filings, that it shuttered the channel and was requesting to revoke its broadcast licence due to inabilities in securing sustainable distribution agreements with television service providers. The company would later that year exit the television broadcasting business entirely when it shuttered its last remaining channel, ichannel, citing the same reasons for closing The Pet Network.

See also
 List of programs broadcast by The Pet Network

References

External links
 The Pet Network

Digital cable television networks in Canada
Television channels and stations established in 2004
Television channels and stations disestablished in 2016
Defunct television networks in Canada
2004 establishments in Canada
2016 disestablishments in Canada
English-language television stations in Canada